Adelaide Ravens  were an Australian netball team that, together with Adelaide Thunderbirds, represented Netball South Australia in the Commonwealth Bank Trophy league. In 1997 Ravens were founder members of the league. In 1999 they were grand finalists. They continued to play in the competition until 2002, when they were replaced by AIS Canberra Darters.

History
Between 1997 and 2002, Adelaide Ravens played in the Commonwealth Bank Trophy league. Together with Adelaide Thunderbirds, Melbourne Kestrels, Melbourne Phoenix, Perth Orioles, Queensland Firebirds, Sydney Sandpipers and Sydney Swifts, Ravens were one of the founding members of the league. The majority of the teams were named after native Australian birds. Ravens were named after the Australian raven. Ravens and Thunderbirds represented Netball South Australia and each team was assigned four state league clubs to select players from.

In 1999, with a team coached by Patricia Mickan and featuring Megan Anderson and Michelle den Dekker, Ravens finished the season as overall runners up. After finishing fourth during the regular season, Ravens defeated Kestrels 61–53 in the minor semi-final and Swifts 56–54 in the preliminary final. In the grand final they lost to 62–30 to Thunderbirds.

In August 2002, Netball Australia decided to drop Ravens from the league. They were subsequently replaced by AIS Canberra Darters.

Regular season statistics

Grand finals

Home venues
Ravens played their home games at ETSA Park  and Adelaide Arena.

Notable former players

Internationals

Captains

Head coaches

Sponsorship

References

Defunct netball teams in Australia
Netball teams in South Australia
Commonwealth Bank Trophy teams
Sporting clubs in Adelaide
Sports clubs established in 1996
1996 establishments in Australia
2002 disestablishments in Australia
Sports clubs disestablished in 2002